Alexander Kovalenko (born 1986) is a Russian sprint canoeist. He participated at the 2018 ICF Canoe Sprint World Championships.

References

1986 births
Russian male canoeists
Living people
ICF Canoe Sprint World Championships medalists in Canadian